Neil Conlan (7 August 1936 – 22 July 1978) was an Australian football player from Tasmania. Conlan played as a forward. Conlan played in the Tasmania Australian rules football team that defeated the Victoria Australian rules football team on 13 July 1960 at York Park, Launceston. He captain-coached Devonport.

Neil Conlan's son Michael Conlan played 210 games for the Fitzroy Football Club.

References

1936 births
1978 deaths
Australian rules footballers from Tasmania
Glenorchy Football Club players
Devonport Football Club players
Devonport Football Club coaches
Manuka Football Club players
Tasmanian Football Hall of Fame inductees